Waukesha County Park System is located in Waukesha County, Wisconsin. It is composed of eight different parks throughout the county: Fox Brook Park, Fox River Park, Menomonee Park, Minooka Park, Mukwonago Park, Muskego Park, Naga-Waukee Park, and Nashotah Park. "From swimming to camping to hiking and cross-country skiing, each park has its own personality." The park system also has five lake accesses: Ashippun, Nagawicka, Nemahbin, Pewaukee, and School Section, three golf courses: Wanaki, Naga-Waukee War Memorial, and Moors Down, two ice arenas: Naga-Waukee and Eble, Retzer Nature Center and the Expo Center.  Dogs are permitted at all parks with the exception of Retzer Nature Center.  Minooka Park, Mukwonago Park and Nashotah Park offer the community fenced in dog parks.

References

External links
 Official Waukesha County Park System website

County parks in Wisconsin
Waukesha County, Wisconsin